Tuduwa Kankanamge Dhammika Sudarshana (born 19 June 1976) is a former Sri Lankan cricketer and current head coach of Sri Lanka U19 cricket team. He pursued his education at the Richmond College, Galle.

Career 
Dhammika started playing school cricket for Richmond College and also went onto captain his school cricket team. He played domestic cricket for Moors Sports Club, Galle Cricket Club and Panadura Sports Club. He also captained the Galle CC in domestic cricket for a brief stint. The then head coach of Sri Lanka Dav Whatmore influenced his inclusion in the Sri Lanka A team but his first national callup was hampered after sustaining a knee injury while warming up playing football. In February 2004, he was included in Sri Lanka Board XI squad captained by Russel Arnold for List A match against touring Australia. He made his Twenty20 debut on 17 August 2004, for Moors Sports Club in the 2004 SLC Twenty20 Tournament.

After his retirement, he served as the head coach of Richmond College cricket team and under his coaching Richmond cricket team had shown improvement from being in relegation to a prominent national school cricket team within ten years.

In January 2021, he was appointed as the interim head coach of the Sri Lanka Under19 cricket team replacing Hashan Tillakaratne with the focus on 2022 Under-19 Cricket World Cup.

In July 2021, he was appointed as the temporary batting coach of Sri Lankan team for the home bilateral limited overs series against India replacing Grant Flower who was tested positive for COVID-19. He was chosen by Sri Lanka Cricket for a short stint as the batting coach as he spent his time in the bio-secure bubble prior to the series against India.

References

External links
 

1976 births
Living people
Uva cricketers
Sri Lanka Cricket Combined XI cricketers
Kandurata cricketers
Sri Lankan cricketers
Sri Lankan cricket coaches
Galle Cricket Club cricketers
Moors Sports Club cricketers
Alumni of Richmond College, Galle
Cricketers from Galle
People from Southern Province, Sri Lanka